Leander J. Talbott (August 13, 1849 – July 23, 1924) was a wealthy Missouri realtor and politician who served as Mayor of Kansas City, Missouri, in 1884.

Talbott was born in rural Meigs County, Ohio, one of eight children of Joshua and Adeline L. (Williamson) Talbott. His father, an Ohio native, was a farmer and miller. The family moved to Kansas City in 1857, where he was educated in the local schools. He entered the real estate business and eventually became active in local Democratic politics.

On September 7, 1876, Talbott married Carrie Madeira, a daughter of the Rev. Dr. Madeira, formerly pastor of the Central Presbyterian Church of Kansas City. They had two sons and one daughter—Addison M., Lee J., and Dorothy. Talbott was elected as the city auditor in 1876, 1877, and 1878.

As mayor he is said to have ridden the first overhead electric interurban in the world  (established by J. C. Henry with the Westport Electric Railway in Kansas City) In 1882, he was one of the original incorporators of the Kansas City Club.

He died in an automobile accident in 1924.

References

1849 births
1924 deaths
Mayors of Kansas City, Missouri
People from Meigs County, Ohio
Missouri Democrats